Uncisudis longirostra is a species of barracudina. It is found in the Eastern Central Atlantic Ocean.

Size

References 

Paralepididae
Taxa named by Günther Maul
Fish described in 1963